Norr Amsberg is a locality situated in Borlänge Municipality, Dalarna County, Sweden with 236 inhabitants in 2010. It lies around seven kilometres northwest of Borlänge.

References 

Populated places in Dalarna County
Populated places in Borlänge Municipality